Neohelicometra is a genus of trematodes in the family Opecoelidae. It consists of only one species, Neohelicometra scorpaenae Siddiqi & Cable, 1960.

Former species
A number of species formerly in Neohelicometra have been synonymised to other genera. They are:
Neohelicometra antarcticae (Holloway & Bier, 1968) Sekerak & Arai, 1974, synonymised to Helicometra antarcticae Holloway & Bier, 1968
Neohelicometra dalianensis Li, Qiu & Zhang, 1989, synonymised to Helicometra dalianensis (Li, Qiu & Zhang, 1989) Cribb, 2005
Neohelicometra insolita (Polyanski, 1955) Sekerak & Arai, 1974, synonymised to Helicometra insolita Polyanski, 1955
Neohelicometra pleurogrammi (Baeva, 1968) Sekerak & Arai, 1974, synonymised to Helicometra pleurogrammi (Baeva, 1968)
Neohelicometra sebastis Sekerak & Arai, 1974, synonymised to Helicometra sebastis (Sekerak & Arai, 1974) Bray, 1979

References

Opecoelidae
Plagiorchiida genera
Monotypic protostome genera